Pebble Beach is a coastal resort community in Monterey County, California, US.

Pebble Beach may also refer to:

Other beaches 
 Pebble Beach in San Mateo County
 Pebble Beach in Sea Ranch, California

In golf 
 Pebble Beach Golf Links, a golf course in Pebble Beach, California
 The Pebble Beach National Pro-Am tournament
 The Pebble Beach Invitational tournament

Other uses 
 Shingle beach, a beach that contains pebbles or cobbles
 Pebble Beach Concours d'Elegance, an annual automotive charitable event
 Pebble Beach no Hotou, a 1992 video game
 A section of the North Lawn of the White House used for television broadcasts.